The Rio Hondo is a river in northern New Mexico. Portions of the Rio Hondo are prized as prime spots for bird-watching and fishing. The river was the subject of a 2005 study by the New Mexico Environment Department Surface Water Quality Bureau into the effects of wastewater from Taos Ski Valley, which is discharged from the Village of Taos Ski Valley Waste Water Treatment Plant.

In Spanish, Río Hondo means "deep river".

See also
 List of tributaries of the Rio Grande
 List of rivers of New Mexico

References

Tributaries of the Rio Grande
Rivers of New Mexico
Rivers of Taos County, New Mexico